Tyler N. Tardi (born August 10, 1998 in Richmond, British Columbia) is a Canadian curler originally from Cloverdale, British Columbia.

Career

Juniors
Tardi first came onto the national curling scene skipping the host British Columbia team at the 2015 Canada Winter Games in Prince George, British Columbia where he would pick up a bronze medal. After losing in the British Columbia junior finals in both 2013 and 2014, Tardi and his rink of Daniel Wenzek, brother Jordan and Nicholas Meister won the 2016 British Columbia men's junior championship. The team represented the province at the 2016 Canadian Junior Curling Championships, and went 7-3 after the round robin portion, making the playoffs in third place. The team would have to settle for a bronze medal after they lost to Manitoba's Matt Dunstone in the semi-final. 

A month later, Tardi would throw third stones (Joined by Sterling Middleton, Mary Fay and Karlee Burgess of Nova Scotia) for Team Canada at the 2016 Winter Youth Olympics. The team steamrolled through the opposition, winning all 10 of their games before claiming a gold medal for their country. In the mixed doubles event, Tardi was teamed up with Japan's Honoka Sasaki. The pair made it to the semi-finals before losing to China's Han Su and Great Britain's Ross Whyte. They then lost in the bronze medal final to China's Zhao Ruiyi and Norway's Andreas Hårstad.

Tardi and his team of Middleton, Jordan Tardi, and Meister won a second provincial junior title in 2017. Representing British Columbia at the 2017 Canadian Junior Curling Championships, the team lost one round robin game en route to winning the national championship, defeating Ontario's Matthew Hall rink in the final. The team represented Canada at the 2017 World Junior Curling Championships, where they finished the round robin with a 6–3 record, but lost to Norway in a tiebreaker game. That year, Tardi also skipped British Columbia at the 2017 Canadian U18 Curling Championships, losing just one round robin game. However, he was not successful in the playoffs, losing in the semifinal, but rebounded in the bronze medal game, defeating Saskatchewan's Rylan Kleiter.

In 2018, Tardi, Middleton, Jordan and new lead Zac Curtis won a third provincial junior title. At the 2018 Canadian Junior Curling Championships, Tardi would defend his title. After losing three round robin games, he had to fight through a tiebreaker before winning two playoff games, including defeating Northern Ontario's Tanner Horgan rink in the final. The team represented Canada at the 2018 World Junior Curling Championships, where they were much more successful. The team lost two round robin games, and won both playoff games, including defeating Scotland in the final to claim the gold medal.

In 2019, Tardi and Middleton added a new front end of Matthew Hall, his opponent in the 2017 Junior finals and Alex Horvath and won a fourth provincial junior title. At the 2019 Canadian Junior Curling Championships, he led his province to his third-straight national championship, becoming the first skip to win three-straight junior championships. Tardi lost just one game en route to the title, and defeated Manitoba's J.T. Ryan in the final. Tardi once again represented Canada at the 2019 World Junior Curling Championships. After posting a 7–2 round robin record, he won both playoff games, including defeating Switzerland's Marco Hösli rink in the final.

The 2019-20 curling season would have been Tardi's last year of junior eligibility, but he decided to make the jump to men's curling full-time, eschewing the junior ranks.

Mixed doubles
In addition to playing in the mixed doubles event at the 2016 Youth Olympics, Tardi has also won two BC mixed doubles championships (2013 and 2015) with Dezaray Hawes. The pair would go 4–3 at both the 2013 Canadian Mixed Doubles Curling Trials and 2015 Canadian Mixed Doubles Curling Trials. In 2015, their record was good enough to make it to the playoffs, where they lost in the round of 12 to Glenn Howard and daughter Carly. They also competed in the 2019 Canadian Mixed Doubles Curling Championship, where they were first in their round-robin pool, but lost in the quarterfinal to Kadriana Sahaidak and Colton Lott.

Men's
Tardi has been playing on the World Curling Tour since 2013. He won his first tour event at the 2016 Prestige Hotels & Resorts Curling Classic. He played in his first Grand Slam event at the 2018 Humpty's Champions Cup by virtue of winning the World Junior championship. He went 1–3 at the event, missing the playoffs. He won another tour event to begin the next season at the 2018 King Cash Spiel. His junior team qualified for the 2019 Champions Cup by winning the World Juniors again. There, the team went win-less in their four matches.  In his first post-junior season, he won the 2019 Prestige Hotels & Resorts Curling Classic. The next season, he won the 2020 Raymond James Kelowna Double Cash event.

Tardi qualified for his first men's provincial championship in 2016, but had to bow out due to his participation at that year's Youth Olympics. The rest of his team played short-handed, and went 2–3. Tardi played in the 2017 BC Men's Curling Championship, going 3-3. He didn't enter playdowns in 2018, but was back at it at the 2019 BC Men's Curling Championship. There, his team were eliminated after posting a 2–3 record. He finally made the playoffs at the 2020 BC Men's Curling Championship, where he lost in the final to Jim Cotter.

Team did not play in any major events in the 2020-21 curling season due to the COVID-19 pandemic. The next season, they played at the 2021 Canadian Olympic Curling Pre-Trials. After finishing group play with a 4–2 record, they lost in the B quarter-finals to Glenn Howard. The team played at the 2022 BC Men's Curling Championship, where they were eliminated in the C1 vs. C2 page playoff game against Jim Cotter.

The Tardi rink disbanded in 2022, with Tardi joining the Kevin Koe rink at third. The team represented Alberta at the 2023 Tim Hortons Brier, where they were eliminated in the page qualifying game.

Personal life
Tardi was a student at Kwantlen Polytechnic University and was an online motion graphic design student at the School of Motion. He is in a relationship with fellow curler Dezaray Hawes. He currently works as a motion graphic design freelancer and lives in Peachland, British Columbia. He is the nephew of three-time Canadian champion Cathy Gauthier and cousin to her son Jacques, 2020 Canadian Junior Men's curling champion skip.

Grand Slam record

Notes

References

External links

 Team website

Living people
1998 births
Curlers from British Columbia
Sportspeople from Surrey, British Columbia
Canadian male curlers
Curlers at the 2016 Winter Youth Olympics
People from Richmond, British Columbia
Kwantlen Polytechnic University alumni
Youth Olympic gold medalists for Canada
People from the Regional District of Central Okanagan